Red Sparowes is an American, Los Angeles-based post-rock band, comprising current and former members of Isis, Marriages, The Nocturnes, Halifax Pier, Angel Hair and Pleasure Forever. Their sound is characteristic of soundscape-influenced experimental rock, with an otherwise uncommon extensive use of a pedal steel guitar.

History
Red Sparowes formed in 2003 as a side project for its members. They signed to Neurot Recordings, Neurosis' record label. They recorded some demos for their debut album, and this led to tours with The Dillinger Escape Plan and Made Out of Babies in 2004. The debut was recorded in May 2004 by engineer Desmond Shea, with the resulting sound in the vein of guitarists Bryant Clifford Meyer and Jeff Caxide's band Isis, Chicago post-rock/metal outfit Pelican, as well as bands as varied as Sonic Youth and The Cure. Members Jeff Caxide and Dana Berkowitz relocated in late 2004, thus forcing them out of the band.

Red Sparowes' first studio album, At the Soundless Dawn, was released in February 2005, following Clifford Meyer's Isis in their initial tours in support of Panopticon. Shortly after this release, a split 12" album was released with Gregor Samsa. The Red Sparowes side contained the second track from At the Soundless Dawn, "Buildings Began to Stretch Wide Across the Sky, And the Air Filled with a Reddish Glow," as well as a track recorded during the album's recording sessions with guitar by Michael Gallagher of Isis, initially only available on the Japanese release of the album. Following the release of the album, the band headlined a tour in Europe and participated in an American tour with Pelican, Big Business and Breather Resist. After touring the band released their follow-up record, Every Red Heart Shines Toward the Red Sun, in 2006. This release was followed by more touring of North America and Europe, including shows in the US with Nick Cave and the Bad Seeds.

In 2008 Josh Graham parted ways with the rest of the band to pursue musical project A Storm of Light.

In May 2008, Red Sparowes recorded new material with engineer Toshi Kasai (Melvins, Big Business, Tool), and in August that year the EP Aphorisms was released digitally.

Red Sparowes began recording their third full-length studio album with Kasai on August 24, 2009. The album, titled The Fear Is Excruciating, But Therein Lies the Answer, was released on April 6, 2010.

Red Sparowes had more or less been on an indefinite hiatus since late 2011, but in late September 2019, the band was announced to be playing at the 2020 edition of the Roadburn festival, as part of a lineup curated by guitarist Emma Ruth Rundle; former Baroness drummer Allen Blickle and Brendan Tobin were returning to the band for the show. On March 24, 2020, the band announced via their official Facebook account that their show had been postponed, as many concerts and tours apart from them had been, due to the COVID-19 pandemic. In the same post the band also confirmed that they were working on a new album.

Band members
Current
 Bryant Clifford Meyer (guitar) of Isis
 Andy Arahood (guitar/bass) formerly of Angel Hair
 Greg Burns (bass/pedal steel) of Marriages & Halifax Pier
 David Clifford (drums) of Pleasure Forever, The VSS
 Emma Ruth Rundle (guitar) of Marriages & The Nocturnes

Former
 Josh Graham (guitar) of Neurosis (visuals), Battle of Mice, A Storm of Light
 Jeff Caxide (guitar/bass) of Isis
 Dana Berkowitz (drums)
 Brendan Tobin (guitar) of Made Out of Babies

Discography

Studio albums

Other works

See also
List of post-rock bands

References

External links
 Red Sparowes
 Red Sparowes' Myspace
 Red Sparowes' Bandcamp
 
 Red Sparowes collection at the Internet Archive's live music archive
 Neurot Recordings
 Robotic Empire
 Sargent House

Musical groups from Los Angeles
American post-rock groups
American post-metal musical groups
American instrumental musical groups
Musical groups established in 2003
Hypertension Records artists